Morgan Topping (born 25 March 1999) is an Irish cricketer. He made his List A debut for Northern Knights in the 2017 Inter-Provincial Cup on 4 June 2017. In December 2017, he was named in Ireland's squad for the 2018 Under-19 Cricket World Cup. He made his Twenty20 debut on 19 September 2021, for Northern Knights in the 2021 Inter-Provincial Trophy.

References

External links
 

1999 births
Living people
Irish cricketers
Northern Knights cricketers
Place of birth missing (living people)